Ziegleria hernandezi is a butterfly in the family Lycaenidae. It is found in Trinidad and on Cuba.

References

Eumaeini
Butterflies of the Caribbean
Butterflies of Cuba
Butterflies of Trinidad and Tobago
Butterflies described in 1993